Caligus curtus is a sea louse species. It is a parasite of the Atlantic cod.

References

Siphonostomatoida
Crustaceans of the Atlantic Ocean
Parasitic crustaceans
Animal parasites of fish
Crustaceans described in 1785
Taxa named by Otto Friedrich Müller